Ameca ( "string of water") is a city and municipality, in Jalisco in central-western Mexico. The municipality covers an area of  685.73 km². The city is bisected by the Ameca River which drains to the Pacific Ocean near Puerto Vallarta. It is also approximately 83 km (approximately 50 miles) from the state capital and one of Mexico's largest commercial centers, Guadalajara.

The city is also the seat and largest city of the federal sub-division Región Valles, which compromises the municipalities situated on the central valleys of Jalisco.

As of 2010, the municipality had a total population of 57,340, and the city had a population of 36,156, making it the 15th largest city of Jalisco in terms of population.

History
In the early 16th century Ameca was the center of the small kingdom of Ameca.  This state was conquered by the Spanish in 1524.  It was part of the alcaldia mayor of Autlan, New Spain during the Spanish colonial period.

The first of the conquerors who arrived in Ameca was the Spanish soldier Juan de Anesta in 1522, who arrived barefoot, alone and with his sword in hand. The natives received him alone because they thought he was the son of the sun, as their ancestors had predicted who would come to conquer and that all would be subject to him and pay tribute.

Juan de Anesta had reached Anesta Olid Colima; lived in Ameca 4 or 5 years, after which it was returned to Colima encomendero of Ameca.

In 1529, Fray Antonio de Cuellar with other friars and Spanish built an adobe chapel, the royal house, the square, jail, an inn and a few houses in what is now the city center.

In 1541, the Spanish started catechizing the natives by Fray Antonio de Cuellar, who died on August 12 of that year when he left Ameca, right in the great revolt against the Spanish that was unleashed by that time. He was attacked in the mountains of Etzatlán and killed by arrow wounds. In 1549, the town of Ameca was elevated to the status of city hall and fell within the territory of New Spain.

The political division of the region had many changes; Ameca depended first of Colima, after Mexico, Sayula and Cocula.

In 1824, it was incorporated into the department's Cocula Turned capital town title in September 1830.

On April 22, 1833, by decree of the State Congress, Ameca was declared a city.

In 1979, Ameca held its founding 450 years and on April 28, the three branches of government moved to establish a formal sitting.

Climate
In Ameca, the January temperature averages 16 °C (60 °F). In June, the average is 23 °C (74 °F). Rainfall is heaviest between June and September. Average annual rainfall is 134 centimeters (53 inches). Puerto Vallarta, to its right on the Pacific Ocean is warmer, with average January temperatures of 22 °C (71 °F) and June average temperatures 28 °C (82 °F).  The Köppen Climate Classification subtype for this climate is "Cfa" (Humid Subtropical Climate).

Geography
Ameca is located in the central-western state of Jalisco, approximately 83 km (approximately 50 miles) from the state capital and one of Mexico's largest commercial centers, Guadalajara. It is located between the coordinates 20 ° 25'00 and 20 º 42'00 north latitude and between 103 º and 104 º 53'15 17'30 west longitude, located at a height of 1,635 meters above sea level . It has an area of 685.73 square km and its population in 2000 was 56.681 people. According to the 2005 population census INEGI, the township population was 54.161 inhabitants.

To the North are the municipalities of San Marcos, and Ahualulco Etzatlán Market, on the south and Tecolotlán Atengo, on the east and San Martín Hidalgo Teuchitlán and west Guachinango and Nayarit.

Its rolling hills or Cuauhtépetl Ameca, mainly occupying the northern part of town, and it has an irregular topography characterized by a succession of valleys and vast mountains in different areas of the municipality.

Water resources, the Ameca River forms the northern reserves by the remnants of streams, Llanitos, La Barranca, La Arena, El Carrizo, and balls, among others, on the south streams feed into The Master, Arroyo Grande, El Zoquite, The Palmarejo, the Alamo and Las Canoas and countless small streams. In addition, there are the dams of San Ignacio de la Vega, Los Pocitos and the Texcalame.

Business and Economy
A large population of Ameca residents are engaged in commercial activities, agriculture and livestock. Several stand-out city industries include the production and engineering of sugar from a great number of resident sugar-cane plantations, the Coca-Cola Company distributor branch, and the feed industry. There is also great production in the businesses of bricks, tortillas, carpentry, bakeries, and saddlery. Ameca also has a large number of shops of various kinds, which are an important part of the economy.

Ameca is home to various well-known service organizations such as the Red Cross, the Rotary Club, Lions Club, nursing and several other charities. In terms of health services, there are numerous nursing homes, hospitals, IMSS clinics, among others. Great educational services are provided by many schools, public and private schools,  at all levels of education. It is worth mentioning that among the most renowned institutions the following are found in the city: Federal High Schools  No. 1 and No. 50, the Homeland School, CETIS 63 (Technical School), the CECATI 180, Regional High School CUValles Ameca and University Center of the Valleys, the latter two from the University of Guadalajara. .

Tequila plantations make up part of Ameca's economy, mostly for private farmers.

The Hayward, California based restaurant chain La Piñata produces a line of tequilas at their distillery in the Ameca region.

Tourism
Ameca is abundant in cultural attractions, one main attraction being the town hall built in 1529, and neoclassical buildings of the former hospital Hilarion Gil Romero currently serving as Regional Cultural Center. Other attractions include the House of Culture and the Temple of Santo Domingo. Other places of interest include the Ex hacienda of Cabezon and San Antonio Matute, built in 1911.

Natural attractions include the Ameca River and many streams like the Palmarejo and pillars. Seen as natural spas, the hills of Ameca and hills are suitable for exploration. The stone rocks in the Sierra de Ameca, appear as old fields with gigantic bowling balls. These peculiar rocks can measure a few centimeters in diameter to 3 meters.

The City Hall dates from 1529 but was burned in 1914 and rebuilt between 1917 and 1924. With its neoclassic facade, it is composed of two stories and to the right side is made up of the famous quadrangular tower clock that has on each side, framed in quarry, battlements.
The House of Culture includes exhibitions of art and historical objects, as well as music and dance events, among others. Also held in August of every year, is the Cultural, a sample of the fine arts, which has been reaching popularity over the years. It has within it the Ameca Regional Museum, which despite being very small, it is important for the quality of its archaeological and paleontological collections consist of more than 10,000 pieces. The rescue of this material was made by Professor Philemon Gutiérrez Ramírez who, for 50 years of his life, collected pieces from the region (Ameca valley, Quitupan, Tala) and other entities of the country (Nayarit, Veracruz and Zacatecas). In 1982, he donated his collection to found a museum with the support of the City.

St. James parish (Parroquia de Santiago) built in the sixteenth century, has had modifications since the 1930s.  Its pink stone facade has a tower composed of three bodies; there are cross atrial figures of the Passion of the Christ and of the inscription made in 1687. In the inside of the temple, the main altarpiece is styled in the neoclassic manner. The recently remodeled atrium looks better than ever with its new and spacious gardens that are home to different types of roses and flowers. Parroquia de Santiago is located in the main square and is one of the most beautiful buildings in the city.

The Temple of our Lady of Guadalupe, or Santuario de la Virgen de Guadalupe, dates back to 1875.

Señor Grande de Ameca, a beautiful sculpture of the crucified Christ made with cornstalk paste by indigenous hands centuries ago, is nearly two meters tall from his feet to his head. With the body and face full of bloody wounds and the open side, is in the niche of the main altar of the church of St. James of Ameca, Jalisco. The largest festival of Lord Ameca is movable, it takes place between the months of April and May, with nine days.

Capilla de la Conchinta, a nineteenth-century parish is also a frequented tourist attraction.

Haciendas are among the most important estates in the area including El Cabezon, San Antonio Matute, La Esperanza, El Portezuelo, The Cuis, Santa Maria de la Huerta, Jayamitla, La Higuera, San Miguel, San Nicolas, La Villita, La Labor de Solis, the work of San Ignacio, La Vega, La Gavilana and San Juan de los Arcos. Some of them in ruins, others partially destroyed and some restored.

Piedras Bola In the Sierra de Ameca, in the area corresponding to Ahualulco de Mercado Township, where in 1867 an American archaeologist discovered more than 20 stone spheres. Piedras Bolas vary in size: on average, between one and two meters in diameter, although some are close to three meters. The age is estimated at around 40 million years ago, during the Tertiary period, by capricious crystallization of volcanic ash, which some attribute to the Tequila Volcano, distant only 30 km.

Other tourist attractions include orchards and natural baths that have formed in the various streams within and around outskirts of the municipality.

Notable people

Mariano Bárcenas (1842-1899). Engineer, Writer, Geographer
Antonio Arróniz Topete (1859- 1926). Engineer
Jose Alonso Zepeda. Goodwill Embassory UNICEF.
 Jose Antonio Flores Bedoy (Tecos FC)
Jesús Amaya Topete. Historian
José Ma. E. Gutiérrez. Doctor, Constitutionalist
Ignacio Zepeda. General
Francisco del Toro. Astronomer
Aurelio Fernández. Doctor 
Román Palomar. Musician and Composer
Guillermo Cañedo de la Bárcena, soccer manager and businessman 
Fernando " Ameca" Vera. Professional Soccer Player
José Salazar López (1910-1991). Cardinal
Gregorio Dávila (1810-1868). Lawyer, Liberal Politician
Carlos Villaseñor (1845-1920). Painter
Ramon Guerrero Vidrio (1945-2007). Dance Professor and Activist
Ruben Lopez Saldaña (1990-2007). National Champion in ParaOlympics
Professor, Activist Vicente Arturo Ponce Rafael (1944-2002). Professor In Science Education
[]], politician, Governor of Jalisco (1977–1983)
Cartel de Jalisco nueva generation  Prominent women in the politics rules, promoter and defender of women's rights Lizaola
Jose Luis Aguilar Rubio. Profe Xhixhi. Yoga Professor and coach Papas Solteros Soccer Team
Jose Luis Becerra "The Critter Trapper". International  Wildlife Consultant and Trapper. Featured in NatGeo Wild Series Invaders: Coyote Army. Current Wildlife Consultant for The City Of Beverly Hills.

Leaders of Ameca

Rulers of the Chiefdom of Amecatl

Rulers of the Alcaldía Mayor de Ameca

Municipal Presidents

References

External links
http://www.ameca.gob.mx/
https://web.archive.org/web/20120425122709/http://www.ameca.mx/web/especial/index

Municipalities of Jalisco